Brent Handler (born October 21, 1969) is an American entrepreneur who works in the destination club industry. He is founder and CEO of Inspirato, a private, luxury destination club. In 2002, along with his brother Brad Handler, he founded Exclusive Resorts and served as the company's president from 2002 to 2009. He is based in Denver, Colorado.

Personal life 
Handler was born October 21, 1969 in Denver, Colorado, the son of Suzanne and Norton Handler. Norton Handler owned a series of clothing manufacturers and shared his passion for entrepreneurism and real estate with both Brent and his older brother Brad during their early years. Handler attended Thomas Jefferson High School (Denver), where he played tennis and basketball, and graduated in 1987. He earned his undergraduate business degree from the University of Colorado at Boulder in 1991.

In 1995, Handler married Kirsten Sweetman. They have three children.

Brother, Brad Handler, went on to become the first in-house attorney at eBay and later joined Brent as a partner in his entrepreneurial pursuits.

Career 
Handler knew he wanted to be an entrepreneur from the age of 23 and experienced early business success at Colorado's ExecuTrain, a computer training company. As the company's second employee, he sold millions of dollars' worth of computer training classes, and performed so well the company's owner had difficulty paying his commission. He later became a co-owner of the company.

After his initial success at ExecuTrain, and the sale of the company, Handler went on to launch two businesses before finding success in the destination club industry.

Exclusive Resorts 

In 2002, along with his brother Brad and a friend, Brent Handler co-founded destination club Exclusive Resorts. He was the company's president from 2002 through 2009, a period of great innovation and growth that led to Exclusive Resorts becoming the recognized industry leader. 
In 2004, the Handlers sold majority ownership of Exclusive Resorts to businessman Steve Case. By the end of 2009, Exclusive Resorts claimed over 3,250 members, nearly 400 homes, and delivered nearly 100,000 completed vacations.  In 2006, Handler was named a finalist for the Denver Business Journal's Entrepreneur of the Year award for his success building Exclusive Resorts.

Inspirato 

In January 2011, along with his brother, Brad Handler, Martin Pucher and Brian Corbett, Brent Handler re-entered the destination club marketplace with the launch of the Denver-based destination club Inspirato. Brent Handler currently serves as the company's CEO. In a departure from the traditional destination club model, Inspirato rents rather than owns its homes, reducing the club's upfront costs and allowing for lower membership fees. Handler's innovative business model and past success in the destination club space led to significant interest from the venture capital community. The company raised $65 million from some of the world's top venture capital firms, including Kleiner Perkins Caufield & Byers and Institutional Venture Partners.  Forbes magazine named Inspirato one of "America’s Most Promising Companies" in November 2011 and Robb Report included the club in its "Best of the Best 2012" list. On May 16, 2012, 16 months after opening, Inspirato announced it had acquired nearly 2,000 club members. In October 2012, Inspirato was recognized as a “Denver Gazelle” by the Denver Office of Economic Development for its successful track record of demonstrating innovation while raising significant investment capital in today's business environment. The company has also received attention for the success of its innovative philanthropic program, Inspired Giving. Since October 2012, the company has helped raise over $2 million for nonprofit organizations, schools and hospitals across the country, including March of Dimes and National Children's Cancer Society, by providing vacation homes for auction at fundraising events.

Boards 

Handler serves as an advisory board member of the Andre Agassi Foundation for Education.

References 

1969 births
Living people